In mathematics, an n-dimensional differential structure (or differentiable structure) on a set M makes M into an n-dimensional differential manifold, which is a topological manifold with some additional structure that allows for differential calculus on the manifold. If M is already a topological manifold, it is required that the new topology be identical to the existing one.

Definition
For a natural number n and some k which may be a non-negative integer or infinity, an n-dimensional Ck differential structure is defined using a Ck-atlas, which is a set of bijections called charts between a collection of subsets of M (whose union is the whole of M), and a set of open subsets of :

which are Ck-compatible (in the sense defined below):

Each such map provides a way in which certain subsets of the manifold may be viewed as being like open subsets of  but the usefulness of this notion depends on to what extent these notions agree when the domains of two such maps overlap.

Consider two charts:

The intersection of the domains of these two functions is

and its map by the two chart maps to the two images: 

The transition map between the two charts is the map between the two images of this intersection under the two chart maps.

Two charts  are Ck-compatible if

are open, and the transition maps

have continuous partial derivatives of order k. If k = 0, we only require that the transition maps are continuous, consequently a C0-atlas is simply another way to define a topological manifold. If k = ∞, derivatives of all orders must be continuous. A family of Ck-compatible  charts covering the whole manifold is a Ck-atlas defining a Ck differential manifold. Two atlases are Ck-equivalent if the union of their sets of charts forms a Ck-atlas. In particular, a Ck-atlas that is C0-compatible with a C0-atlas that defines a topological manifold is said to determine a Ck differential structure on the topological manifold. The Ck equivalence classes of such atlases are the distinct Ck differential structures of the manifold. Each distinct differential structure is determined by a unique maximal atlas, which is simply the union of all atlases in the equivalence class.

For simplification of language, without any loss of precision, one might just call a maximal Ck−atlas on a given set a Ck−manifold. This maximal atlas then uniquely determines both the topology and the underlying set, the latter being the union of the domains of all charts, and the former having the set of all these domains as a basis.

Existence and uniqueness theorems
For any integer k > 0 and any n−dimensional Ck−manifold, the maximal atlas contains a C∞−atlas on the same underlying set by a theorem due to Hassler Whitney. It has also been shown that any maximal Ck−atlas contains some number of distinct maximal C∞−atlases whenever n > 0, although for any pair of these distinct C∞−atlases there exists a C∞−diffeomorphism identifying the two. It follows that there is only one class of smooth structures (modulo pairwise smooth diffeomorphism) over any topological manifold which admits a differentiable structure, i.e. The C∞−, structures in a Ck−manifold. A bit loosely, one might express this by saying that the smooth structure is (essentially) unique. The case for k = 0 is different.

Smooth structures on an orientable manifold are usually counted modulo orientation-preserving smooth homeomorphisms. There then arises the question whether orientation-reversing diffeomorphisms exist. There is an "essentially unique" smooth structure for any topological manifold of dimension smaller than 4. For compact manifolds of dimension greater than 4, there is a finite number of "smooth types", i.e. equivalence classes of pairwise smoothly diffeomorphic smooth structures. In the case of Rn with n ≠ 4, the number of these types is one, whereas for n = 4, there are uncountably many such types. One refers to these by exotic R4.

Differential structures on spheres of dimension 1 to 20

The following table lists the number of smooth types of the topological m−sphere Sm for the values of the dimension m from 1 up to 20. Spheres with a smooth, i.e. C∞−differential structure not smoothly diffeomorphic to the usual one are known as exotic spheres.

It is not currently known how many smooth types the topological 4-sphere S4 has, except that there is at least one.  There may be one, a finite number, or an infinite number.  The claim that there is just one is known as the smooth Poincaré conjecture (see Generalized Poincaré conjecture). Most mathematicians believe that this conjecture is false, i.e. that S4 has more than one smooth type. The problem is connected with the existence of more than one smooth type of the topological 4-disk (or 4-ball).

Differential structures on topological manifolds
As mentioned above, in dimensions smaller than 4, there is only one differential structure for each topological manifold. That was proved by Tibor Radó for dimension 1 and 2, and by Edwin E. Moise in dimension 3. By using obstruction theory, Robion Kirby and Laurent C. Siebenmann were able to show that the number of PL structures for compact topological manifolds of dimension greater than 4 is finite. John Milnor, Michel Kervaire, and Morris Hirsch proved that the number of smooth structures on a compact PL manifold is finite and agrees with the number of differential structures on the sphere for the same dimension (see the book Asselmeyer-Maluga, Brans chapter 7) . By combining these results, the number of smooth structures on a compact topological manifold of dimension not equal to 4 is finite. 

Dimension 4 is  more complicated. For compact manifolds, results depend on the complexity of the manifold as measured by the second Betti number b2. For large Betti numbers b2 > 18 in a simply connected 4-manifold, one can use a surgery along a knot or link to produce a new differential structure. With the help of this procedure one can produce countably infinite many differential structures. But even for simple spaces such as  one doesn't know the construction of other differential structures. For non-compact 4-manifolds there are many examples like  having uncountably many differential structures.

See also
 Mathematical structure
 Exotic R4
 Exotic sphere

References